USS Eel may refer to:

 , a proposed United States Navy Balao-class submarine; the contract for her construction was cancelled in 1944
 USS Eel, a fictitious World War II U.S. Navy submarine which appears in Edward L. Beachs 1955 novel Run Silent, Run Deep and in the 1958 movie Run Silent, Run Deep based on the novel.

United States Navy ship names